The use of performance-enhancing drugs (doping) is prohibited within the sport of athletics. Athletes who are found to have used such banned substances, whether through a positive drugs test, the biological passport system, an investigation or public admission, may receive a competition ban for a length of time which reflects the severity of the infraction. Athletes who are found to have banned substances in their possession, or who tamper with or refuse to submit to drug testing can also receive bans from the sport. Competitive bans may also be given to athletes who test positive for prohibited recreational drugs or stimulants with little performance-enhancing effect for competitors in athletics. The sports body responsible for determining which substances are banned in athletics is the World Anti-Doping Agency (WADA).

Typically, any athlete who tests positive for banned substances after having served a previous ban receives a lifetime ban from the sport of athletics. Many high-profile sportspeople to receive doping bans have come from the sport of athletics, with significant past cases concerning Ben Johnson, Marion Jones and Tim Montgomery. Furthermore, a number of athletes who underwent state-sponsored doping programmes in East Germany and the Soviet Union between the 1950s and 1980s were competitors in athletics, but the quality of the international anti-doping work was so poor that only one East German athlete ever tested positive. Following allegations of state-sponsored doping in Russia, the IAAF suspended the country's athletes from competition, including the 2016 Summer Olympics.

See also

Use of performance-enhancing drugs in the Olympic Games
List of doping cases in sport
List of doping cases in cycling
Sportspeople in doping cases by nationality

References

External links
IAAF: Anti-doping 
World Anti-Doping Code, WADA
WADA Prohibited List
2010 WADA Prohibited List

Doping
Athletics